Princess Titaua Marama of Tahiti (1842–1898), also known as Tetuanui Reiaitera'iatea Titaua Salmon, was a Tahitian princess who traveled the 10,000 miles from Tahiti to Scotland in 1892.

Early life
She was born November 3, 1842 in Papetoai, Moorea, in the Society Islands, the daughter of Alexander Salmon and Princess Arrioehau. Growing up as Chiefess of Haapiti, she met the author Robert Louis Stevenson and the painter Constance Gordon-Cumming  when they visited the island.

At the age of 14, in July 1859, she married Scottish merchant John Brander. Together they had nine children. Following Brander's death in 1877, she married her second husband, George Darsie, in Tahiti in 1878. Together she and Darsie had six children, five of whom died.

Scotland
In 1892 she moved with Darsie to Anstruther, Scotland.

She died on 25 September 1898 in Anstruther, after giving birth to her fifteenth child, who was known as Princess Paloma. She is buried alongside Darsie at the Anstruther Parish Church.

She is the subject of the book From the South Seas to the North Sea by British-American author Fiona J Mackintosh.

References

1842 births
1892 deaths
People from Tahiti
Tahitian women